Hillje (pronounced "Hill-Gee") is an unincorporated community in Wharton County, Texas, United States. According to the Handbook of Texas, the community had an estimated population of 51 in 2000.

History
The community was named for Fred Hillje, who purchased part of a local ranch in 1888. Many of its earliest settlers were of Czech and German descent.

Geography
Hillje is located at the junction of U.S. Highway 59 (US 59) and FM 441 in western Wharton County, approximately 18 miles west of Wharton.

Economy
Hillje contains several businesses. Prasek's Hillje Smokehouse is one of the largest businesses in Hillje as well as one of the top employers.

Education
Public education is provided by the Louise Independent School District. The district's campuses are located in Louise, a few miles west of Hillje on U.S. Highway 59 (US 59).

Notes

References

External links
Louise-Hillje Chamber of Commerce

Czech-American culture in Texas
German-American culture in Texas
Unincorporated communities in Wharton County, Texas
Unincorporated communities in Texas